James Cunningham Baxter (8 November 1925 – May 1994) was a Scottish footballer who played for Dunfermline Athletic, Barnsley, Preston North End, and Morecambe. He scored more than 100 Football League goals and was part of the Preston North End team in the 1954 FA Cup Final.

References

External links

1925 births
1994 deaths
Footballers from Dunfermline
Scottish footballers
Association football inside forwards
Dunfermline Athletic F.C. players
Barnsley F.C. players
Preston North End F.C. players
Morecambe F.C. players
Huddersfield Town A.F.C. wartime guest players
English Football League players
People educated at Beath High School
FA Cup Final players